Kamakhyaguri Railway Station serves the town of Uttar Kamakhyaguri, Alipurduar district in the Indian state of West Bengal.
The station lies on the New Jalpaiguri–New Bongaigaon section of Barauni–Guwahati line of Northeast Frontier Railway. This station falls under Alipurduar railway division.

Trains
Major Trains:
Sealdah–Agartala Kanchanjunga Express
Sealdah–Silchar Kanchanjunga Express
Dibrugarh–Howrah Kamrup Express via Guwahati
Dibrugarh–Howrah Kamrup Express Via Rangapara North
New Jalpaiguri - Bongaigaon Express

References

Alipurduar railway division
Railway stations in West Bengal
Railway stations in Alipurduar district